Barbalha is a municipality in the state of Ceará in the Northeast region of Brazil. It is located at the south of the state,  from the state capital of  Fortaleza. The eastern part of the Araripe-Apodi National Forest, established in 1946, is located in Barbalha. The city sits at the foot of the Chapada do Araripe, a large plateau on the border of Ceará and Pernambuco.

The municipality of Barbalha is located in the microregion of the Vale do Cariri, in the south of the state of Ceará. It is bordered by the municipalities of Crato, Juazeiro do Norte, Porteiras, Jardim, and Missão Velha.

In the Portuguese colonial period the larger region of southern Ceará belonged to Francisco Magalhães Barreto (1816-1887), a sugarcane landowner. The small settlement of Barbalha was elevated to parish (freguesia) status by Provincial Law No. 91 of August 30, 1838. On August 7, 1846, by Provincial Law no. 374, it was raised to village status and a judiciary seat was created there. Barbalha was then detached from the municipality of Crato. Barbalha was elevated to municipality status by Provincial Law no. 9740 on August 30, 1876.

Barbalha is associated with significant events of history in Ceará in the 19th century. Residents of the town participated in the Pernambucan Revolt of 1817 and in the Confederation of the Equator, a short-lived rebellion that occurred in the Northeastern region of Brazil in 1824.

An important festival in Barbalha is the Festa do Pau-da-Bandeira de Santo Antonio (Feast of the Flagpole of Saint Anthony) in June. The municipality produces famous rapadura (panela) (unrefined whole cane sugar) and cassava flour. Other industries in the town produce marble, bricks, tiles, and Portland cement.

Former Town Hall

The former town hall of Barbalha (Casa de Câmara e Cadeia) was built during the great drought of 1877. Construction of the building was approved to create work for unemployed farmers. The square at the town hall is the location of Festa do Pau-da-Bandeira de Santo Antonio. The building, according to town residents, was renovated at the beginning of the 1930s. The town hall became a protected structure of the State of Ceará on March 3, 1995.

Notable people
 

Hermes Carleial (1904–1954), Brazilian poet, lawyer, accountant and writer

See also
List of municipalities in Ceará

References

Municipalities in Ceará
Populated places established in 1846